The Gary L. Davidson Award was given to the most valuable player of the World Hockey Association regular season, from 1973 to 1975. It was named in honour of WHA co-founder Gary Davidson, but for the 1975–76 WHA season, it was renamed the Gordie Howe Trophy in honour of one of hockey's all-time greats; Gordie Howe (who won the award in 1974).

Winners
1973 – Bobby Hull, Winnipeg Jets
1974 – Gordie Howe, Houston Aeros
1975 – Bobby Hull, Winnipeg Jets
1976 – Marc Tardif, Quebec Nordiques
1977 – Robbie Ftorek, Phoenix Roadrunners
1978 – Marc Tardif, Quebec Nordiques
1979 – Dave Dryden, Edmonton Oilers

See also
List of WHA seasons
World Hockey Association

World Hockey Association trophies and awards